Carmen Perea Alcalá (born 3 May 1952) is a Spanish former professional tennis player.

Biography
Perea was born in Melilla, an autonomous Spanish city on the African continent. She later moved to Málaga and then at the age of 18 settled in Barcelona.

From 1973 to 1983 she appeared in 29 Federation Cup ties for Spain, winning 19 matches overall. One of her singles wins over was West German Sylvia Hanika in 1980. During this period she was the top female player in Spain and won nine Spanish Tennis Championships, in a run which included ten successive finals. She featured regularly in the main draw of the French Open and played doubles at Wimbledon and the US Open.

Since retiring from professional tennis she has worked as a tennis coach and tournament director. She was the personal coach of Patricia Medrado in the 1980s and more recently has coached Nuria Llagostera.

See also
List of Spain Fed Cup team representatives

References

External links
 
 
 

1952 births
Living people
Spanish female tennis players
Spanish tennis coaches
Sportspeople from Melilla
Sportspeople from Málaga
Tennis players from Andalusia
20th-century Spanish women
21st-century Spanish women